Kushkari-ye Namdar (also Romanized as Kūshkarī-ye Nāmdār) is a village in Dasht-e Zahab Rural District, Central District, Sarpol-e Zahab County, Kermanshah Province, Iran. At the 2006 census, its population was 115, in 23 families.

References 

Populated places in Sarpol-e Zahab County